Elections to the United States House of Representatives were held in Pennsylvania on October 9, 1804, for the 9th Congress.

Background
In the previous election, a delegation of all Democratic-Republicans had been elected to Congress.  At this time, a moderate wing of the Democratic-Republican party, known as the Constitutional Republicans or tertium quids ("quids" for short) had broken off from the majority and ran candidates in several districts.  The Quids were generally allied with the Federalists.

Congressional districts
Pennsylvania was divided into 11 districts, of which four were plural districts with 11 Representatives between them.  Several new counties were created between the 1802 elections and the 1804 elections. The districts were:
The  (3 seats) consisted of Delaware and Philadelphia counties (including the City of Philadelphia)
The  (3 seats) consisted of Bucks, Luzerne, Montgomery, Northampton, and Wayne Counties
The  (3 seats) consisted of Berks, Chester, and Lancaster Counties
The  (2 seats) consisted of Cumberland, Dauphin, Huntingdon, and Mifflin Counties
The  consisted of Centre, Clearfield, Lycoming, McKean, Northumberland, Potter, and Tioga Counties
The  consisted of Adams and York Counties
The  consisted of Bedford and Franklin Counties
The  consisted of Armstrong, Cambria, Indiana, Jefferson, Somerset, and Westmoreland Counties
The  consisted of Fayette and Greene Counties
The  consisted of Washington County
The  consisted of Allegheny, Beaver, Butler, Crawford, Erie, Mercer, Venango, and Warren Counties

The borders between the 4th, 5th, and 8th districts were altered slightly in the erection of new counties from parts of several counties

Note: Many of these counties covered much larger areas than they do today, having since been divided into smaller counties

Election results
Fifteen incumbents ran for re-election, of whom 14 won. One seat changed from Democratic-Republican to Federalist.

Special elections

Special election to the 8th Congress 
William Hoge (DR) of the  resigned October 15, 1804.  A special election was held November 2, 1804 to fill his seat for the remainder of the 8th Congress

John Hoge was William's brother.

Special elections to the 9th Congress
Two special elections were held on October 8, 1805.

Michael Leib (DR) of the  resigned February 14, 1806.  A special election was held November 27, 1806

References
Electoral data are from The Wilkes University Election Statistics Project

1804
Pennsylvania
United States House of Representatives